Raynolds Peak is in the northern Teton Range, Grand Teton National Park, Wyoming. The mountain rises to the north of Moran Canyon and has numerous deep cirques on its north face above Snowshoe Canyon. There are no maintained trails in the region and the summit is 5 miles (8 km) west of Moran Bay on Jackson Lake. The peak is named after William F. Raynolds who was in charge of the 1859-1860 Raynolds Expedition to the region.

References

Mountains of Grand Teton National Park
Mountains of Wyoming
Mountains of Teton County, Wyoming